Amanda Diana Bishop (born 10 December 1979) is an Australian actress and comedian, known for her comedy portrayals of Julia Gillard, the former Prime Minister of Australia, in the television comedy At Home with Julia.  Bishop had previously portrayed Gillard in the series Double Take, when Gillard was Deputy Prime Minister of Australia.

Raised in Bunnan in the Hunter Region of New South Wales, Bishop gained a degree in music from the University of New England, and then trained at the Western Australian Academy of Performing Arts.

Bishop has collaborated with producer Michael Bourchier on two children's television series: The Upside Down Show, on which she played the role of Mrs. Foil in every episode, and Penelope K, by the way, on which she played the title role.

Bishop first impersonated Julia Gillard as part of Waiting for Garnaut, the 2008 Wharf Revue by the Sydney Theatre Company's Jonathan Biggins, Phillip Scott and Drew Forsythe. She reprised the role for the short-lived sketch comedy Double Take. A clip filmed for Double Take of Bishop performing "9 to 9", a parody of "9 to 5" mocking Kevin Rudd's reputation for working his staff hard, was a hit on YouTube after Gillard became Prime Minister and the skit was mentioned on Q&A by Magda Szubanski. In 2011 Bishop co-wrote, and portrayed Gillard in, the four-part sitcom, At Home with Julia, on ABC1 lampooning the relationship between Gillard and her real partner Tim Mathieson (played by Bishop's Myles Barlow co-star, Phil Lloyd). Bishop reprised the Gillard character once again, among other roles, in the comedy series Wednesday Night Fever.

In 2017, she appeared in the children's television series Drop Dead Weird.

References

External links

Living people
Australian television actresses
Australian women comedians
Australian impressionists (entertainers)
University of New England (Australia) alumni
People from the Hunter Region
1979 births